Palm most commonly refers to:
 Palm of the hand, the central region of the front of the hand
 Palm plants, of family Arecaceae
List of Arecaceae genera
 Several other plants known as "palm"

Palm or Palms may also refer to:

Music
 Palm (band), an American rock band
 Palms (band), an American rock band featuring members of Deftones and Isis
 Palms (Palms album), their 2013 album
 Palms (Thrice album), a 2018 album by American rock band Thrice

Businesses and organizations
 Palm, Inc., defunct American electronics manufacturer
 Palm Breweries, a Belgian company
 Palm Pictures, an American entertainment company
 Palm Records, a French jazz record label
 Palms Casino Resort, a hotel and casino in Las Vegas, U.S.
 The Palm (restaurant), New York City, U.S.
 Palm Cabaret and Bar, Puerto Vallarta, Jalisco, Mexico

Places

United States

 Midway, Lafayette County, Arkansas, also known as Palm
 Palm, Pennsylvania
 Palms, Los Angeles
 Palms station
 Palms, Minden Township, Michigan

Elsewhere
 Palms, Walkerston, Queensland, Australia
 Palm Islands, three artificial islands on the coast of Dubai, United Arab Emirates

Science and technology
 PaLM, a large language model developed by Google
 Palm (PDA), a personal digital assistant
 Palm OS, a discontinued operating system 
 Photoactivated localization microscopy (PALM) 
 PALM gene in humans

Other uses
 Palm (surname), a name (including a list of people with the name)
 Palm (unit), an obsolete unit of length, originally based on the width of the human palm
 Palm branch, a symbol of victory, triumph, peace, and eternal life
 Palming, a sleight-of-hand technique
 Palm, an enhancement to the Croix de Guerre award
 Palm, ISO 15924 code for Palmyrene script

See also
 Palm wine (disambiguation)
 The Palms (disambiguation)
 Palme (disambiguation)
 Palma (disambiguation)
 Palmer (disambiguation)
 Palmistry, foretelling of the future through the study of the palm
 Sago, a starch extracted from the pith of various tropical palm stems
 Palm Sunday
 Facepalm